Borgsweer is a town in the Dutch province of Groningen. It is a part of the municipality of Eemsdelta, and is located about 31 km east of Groningen.

The statistical area "Borgsweer", which also can include the surrounding countryside, has a population of around 130.

References

External links 
 

Populated places in Groningen (province)
Eemsdelta